This is a list of New Zealand organisations with royal patronage.
Cancer Society of New Zealand
Corps of Royal New Zealand Engineers
Corps of Royal New Zealand Military Police
New Zealand Conservation Trust
New Zealand Medical Association
New Zealand Riding for the Disabled Association
New Zealand Thoroughbred Breeders' Association
Royal Aeronautical Society (New Zealand Division)
Royal Agricultural Society of New Zealand
Royal Akarana Yacht Club
Royal Arcadian Yacht Club
Royal Astronomical Society of New Zealand
Royal Auckland Golf Club
Royal Australasian College of Physicians
Royal Australasian College of Surgeons
Royal Australian and New Zealand College of Ophthalmologists
Royal Australian and New Zealand College of Obstetricians and Gynaecologists
Royal Australian and New Zealand College of Psychiatrists
Royal Australian and New Zealand College of Radiologists
Royal Christchurch Musical Society
Royal College of Pathologists of Australasia
Royal Dunedin Male Choir
Royal East Auckland Curry Club
Royal Federation of New Zealand Justices' Associations
Royal Forest and Bird Protection Society of New Zealand
Royal Humane Society of New Zealand
Royal New Zealand Aero Club
Royal New Zealand Air Force
Royal New Zealand Air Force Museum
Royal New Zealand Armoured Corps
Royal New Zealand Army Dental Corps
Royal New Zealand Army Logistic Regiment
Royal New Zealand Army Medical Corps
Royal New Zealand Army Nursing Corps
Royal New Zealand Army Ordnance Corps
Royal New Zealand Ballet
Royal New Zealand Coastguard Federation
Royal New Zealand College of General Practitioners
Royal New Zealand Corps of Signals
Royal New Zealand Corps of Transport
Royal New Zealand College of Obstetricians and Gynaecologists
Royal New Zealand Electrical and Mechanical Engineers
Royal New Zealand Fencible Corps
Royal New Zealand Foundation of the Blind
Royal New Zealand Infantry Regiment
Royal New Zealand Institute of Horticulture
Royal New Zealand Naval Volunteer Reserve
Royal New Zealand Navy
Royal New Zealand Pipe Bands' Association
Royal New Zealand Plunket Society
Royal New Zealand Police College
Royal New Zealand Returned and Services' Association
Royal New Zealand Show
Royal New Zealand Society for the Prevention of Cruelty to Animals
Royal New Zealand Yacht Squadron
Royal New Zealand Well Digger's Association
Royal New Zealand Women's Army Corps
Royal Numismatic Society of New Zealand
Royal Philatelic Society of New Zealand
Royal Port Nicholson Yacht Club
Royal Regiment of New Zealand Artillery
Royal School of Church Music New Zealand
Royal Scottish Country Dance Society New Zealand Branch
Royal Society of New Zealand
Royal Wanganui Opera House
Royal Wellington Golf Club

Royal Family members with honorary military appointments

Notes

References

See also
List of Australian organisations with royal patronage
List of Canadian organizations with royal patronage
List of UK organisations with royal patronage
List of Irish organizations with royal patronage
Monarchy in New Zealand